The black-eared warbler or Costa Rican warbler (Basileuterus melanotis) is a species of bird in the family Parulidae.  It was previously considered conspecific with the three-striped warbler and the Tacarcuna warbler.

Description

The black-eared warbler measures  in length.  It is mostly olive-brown with a buffy belly and underparts.  It has distinct black and white striping on the head and a dark cheek.  Male and female three-striped warblers have similar plumages.

Their song is a rapid series of squeaky chirps.

Distribution and habitat

It is found from Costa Rica to western Panama. Its natural habitats are subtropical or tropical moist montane forests and heavily degraded former forest.  The black-eared warbler typically forages on the ground, especially near riparian areas.

References

Donegan, T.M. 2014. Geographical variation in morphology and voice of Three-striped Warbler Basileuterus tristriatus. Bulletin of the British Ornithologists' Club 134: 79–109.
Gutiérrez-Pinto, N., A.M. Cuervo, J. Miranda, J.L. Pérez-Emán, R.T. Brumfield, and C.D. Cadena. 2012. Non-monophyly and deep genetic differentiation across low-elevation barriers in a Neotropical montane bird (Basileuterus tristriatus; Aves: Parulidae). Molecular Phylogenetics and Evolution 64: 156–165.

black-eared warbler
Birds of Costa Rica
Birds of Panama
black-eared warbler